Platycheirus pictipes, the cobalt sedgesitter, is a common species of syrphid fly observed in Western North America and across Canada. Hoverflies can remain nearly motionless in flight. The  adults are also  known as flower flies for they are commonly found on flowers from which they get both energy-giving nectar and protein-rich pollen. Larvae are aphid predators.

References

Hoverflies of North America
Syrphinae
Insects described in 1884
Taxa named by Jacques-Marie-Frangile Bigot